A creature of statute (also known as creature of the state) is a legal entity, such as a corporation, created by statute. Creatures of statute may include municipalities and other artificial legal entities or relationships. Thus, when a statute in some fashion requires the formation of a corporate body—often for governmental purposes—such bodies when formed are known as "creatures of statute." The same concept is also expressed with the phrase "creature of the state."

The term "creature of statute" is most common to the United States. In the United Kingdom, these bodies are simply called statutory corporations (or statutory bodies) and generally have some governmental function. The United Kingdom Atomic Energy Authority is an example. In a wider sense, most companies in the UK are created under statute since the Companies Act 1985 specifies how a company may be created by a member of the public, but these companies are not called 'statutory corporations'. Often, in American legal and business documents that speak of governing bodies (e.g., a board that governs small businesses in China) these bodies are described as "creatures of statute" to inform readers of their origins and format although the national governments that created them may not term them as creatures of statute. Australia also uses the term "creature of statute" to describe some governmental bodies.

The importance of a corporate body, regardless of its exact function, when such a body is a creature of statute is that its active functions can only be within the scope detailed by the statute which created that corporation. Thereby, the creature of statute is the tangible manifestation of the functions or work described by a given statute. The jurisdiction of a body that is a creature of statute is also therefore limited to the functional scope written into the laws that created that body. Unlike most (private) corporate bodies, creatures of statute cannot expand their business interests into other diverse areas.

See also
 Competition regulator
 Statutory authority
 Regulatory agency
 Independent agencies of the United States government
 Public Authority
 Quango

Notes

Administrative law
Corporate law
Statutory law
Legal fictions